Boduthiladhunmathi is the largest atoll in the Maldives, consisting of the administrative divisions Haa Alif Atoll , Haa Dhaalu Atoll , Shaviyani Atoll and Noonu Atoll. 

Politics of the Maldives